Live is the first live album of the reggae artist Burning Spear, which was recorded at the Rainbow Theatre with the band Aswad as backup.  It was released in 1977.

Track listing
"The Ghost" (Marcus Garvey) - 4:40
"I and I Survive" (Slavery Days) - 4:19
"Black Soul" - 5:36
"Lion" - 6:05
"Further East Of Jack" (Old Marcus Garvey) - 4:53
"Man In The Hills" - 4:54
"Throw Down Your Arms" - 3:16

Credits
Recorded live at the Rainbow Theatre, London, England, October, 1977
Published by Island Music, Inc. (BMI) Except "Lion" and "Throw Down Your Arms" published by Burning Spear Publishing (ASCAP)
Sound Engineer:  Dennis Thompson
Recorded By Frank Owen, Island Mobile
Mixed At Island, Hammersmith By Gowin Logie and Terry Barham
Mastered By John Dent at Trident Studios
Cover Photos – Peter Murphy and Claire Hershman
Special Thanks to Dennis Thompson

Musicians
The core of musicians on the album made up the band Aswad.
Winston Rodney aka Burning Spear – vocals
Phillip Fullwood – congos
George Lee – saxophone
Angus Gaye – drums
Bobby Ellis – trumpet
Brinsley Forde – rhythm guitar
George Oban – bass
Courtney Hemmings – keyboards
Donald Griffins – lead guitar

1977 live albums
Burning Spear live albums
Island Records live albums